The South African cricket team visited India for cricket matches in the 2005–06 season. All the matches were one-day games, with five One Day Internationals and a tour match against a team from Hyderabad. Both sides were coming off series wins, India beating Sri Lanka 6–1 at home while South Africa had enjoyed a 5–0 win over New Zealand. Before the series, the BBC Sport website had a preview which argued that India and South Africa were both "more serious challengers to Australia's crown" as defending World Champions, and that the crowds "could be in for some seriously good cricket" 

It was a close series, at any rate – South Africa took the lead twice in the series, but couldn't hold on, and with the third ODI at M. A. Chidambaram Stadium rained off, the series was won by India 3–2. The Man of the Series award was also shared, between Graeme Smith of South Africa and Yuvraj Singh of India, who topped the batting averages of their teams with 209 runs. On the bowling side, Shaun Pollock contributed with seven wickets and nine maiden overs, but went for 5.5 an over in the final ODI, when India were set 222 runs to win in 50 overs.

Squads

ODI series

1st ODI

2nd ODI

Third ODI

Fourth ODI

A huge Bengali crowd showed support for South Africa in this match. They were angry over Greg Chappell's decision to exclude Saurav Ganguly leading to Chappell–Ganguly controversy. Later Greg allegedly showed 
midfinger to the crowd.

Fifth ODI

References

  World Cup contenders?, by Oliver Brett, published on BBC Sport 14 November 2005
  South Africa Squad from Cricinfo, retrieved 15 December 2005
  Gibbs and Boje pull out of India tour published 31 October 2005 on Cricinfo
  India Squad from Cricinfo, retrieved 15 December 2005
  Hyderabad XI v South Africans scorecard, from Cricinfo, retrieved 15 December 2005
  Kallis steers South Africa home, from Cricinfo, published 16 November 2005
  1st ODI: India v South Africa, Run-Rate Comparison, published 25 November 2005
  1st ODI: India v South Africa scorecard, from Cricinfo, retrieved 15 December 2005
  2nd ODI: India v South Africa scorecard, from Cricinfo, retrieved 15 December 2005
  3rd ODI: India v South Africa scorecard, from Cricinfo, retrieved 15 December 2005
  4th ODI: India v South Africa scorecard, from Cricinfo, retrieved 15 December 2005
  5th ODI: India v South Africa scorecard, from Cricinfo, retrieved 15 December 2005

External links
 BBC Sport | South Africa in India in 2005
 Tour home at ESPNcricinfo

2005 in Indian cricket
2005 in South African cricket
Indian cricket seasons from 2000–01
International cricket competitions in 2005–06
2005-06